James Alfred Jones (3 August 1927 – 5 May 2015) was an English professional footballer who played as a goalkeeper for Accrington Stanley in the Football League.

References

1927 births
2015 deaths
English footballers
Accrington Stanley F.C. (1891) players
Rochdale A.F.C. players
New Brighton A.F.C. players
Everton F.C. players
Lincoln City F.C. players
English Football League players
Association football goalkeepers
Sportspeople from Cheshire